Third National Bank Building is a historic office building located at Gastonia, Gaston County, North Carolina, USA. It was designed by Milburn, Heister & Company and built in 1923. It is an eight-story, four bay wide, English Tudor Revival style steel frame building. It is sheathed in dark red brick and stone with a molded terra cotta covered top story.  It features a projecting main entrance with a two-story segmental arched opening.

It was listed on the National Register of Historic Places in 1986. It is located in the Downtown Gastonia Historic District.

References

Office buildings on the National Register of Historic Places in North Carolina
Tudor Revival architecture in North Carolina
Office buildings completed in 1923
Buildings and structures in Gaston County, North Carolina
National Register of Historic Places in Gaston County, North Carolina
Individually listed contributing properties to historic districts on the National Register in North Carolina